Tienerklanken (English: Teen Sounds) was a Belgian Dutch language pop music television programme. It was broadcast from 1963 to 1973, running on the Vlaamse Radio- en Televisieomroeporganisatie Belgian television network. It showcased European and American stars of the pop, rock and rhythm and blues genres, such as Jacques Brel, The Rolling Stones, Jimi Hendrix and Pink Floyd. The show also had segments dealing with controversial counterculture revolution topics, such as drugs and sex.

Notes

External links
IMDB article

Pop music television series
Belgian music television shows
1963 Belgian television series debuts
1973 Belgian television series endings
Dutch-language television shows
Flemish television shows
Eén original programming